Nebula is a fictional character appearing in American comic books published by Marvel Comics. Created by Roger Stern and John Buscema, the character first appeared in The Avengers #257 (July 1985). Originally depicted as a supervillain, Nebula was later depicted as an antihero and member of the Guardians of the Galaxy.
 	
Nebula has appeared in various adaptations of the character in other media, including animated television series and video games. Karen Gillan portrays the character in the Marvel Cinematic Universe films Guardians of the Galaxy (2014), Guardians of the Galaxy Vol. 2 (2017), Avengers: Infinity War (2018), Avengers: Endgame (2019), Thor: Love and Thunder (2022) and The Guardians of the Galaxy Holiday Special (2022) in addition to voicing alternate timeline versions in the Disney+ animated series What If...? (2021).

Publication history

Nebula was created by writer Roger Stern and artist John Buscema, and first appeared in The Avengers #257 (July 1985).

Fictional character biography

A brutal space pirate and mercenary, Nebula seized control of Sanctuary II, a massive spaceship previously under the command of Thanos. Thanos was believed to be dead at this point, and Nebula claimed that he had been her grandfather. Nebula's band of mercenaries and pirates consisted of Skunge, Kehl, Gunthar and Levan.

Nebula asked the second Captain Marvel to join her mercenary band and aid them in conquering the Skrull Empire, but she only pretended to go along with her plan. However, Firelord learned that Nebula had massacred the Xandarians. Eventually Nebula used her space fleet to attack the Skrull space armada and the Avengers.

Nebula then schemed to gain absolute power by using Earth scientist Dr. Harker's atomic compressor to release vast amounts of energy that were absorbed by the Infinity Union. This attempt nearly triggered the end of the universe when the experiment caused a second Big Bang that came close to annihilating everything before a small group of Avengers Captain America, Iron Man, Thor, Spider-Man and Sersi were able to escape the destruction and shut down the equipment in time to negate the unmaking of existence. She fought the Avengers, absorbing energies from the Infinity Union through the implant in her brain until Sersi removed the brain implant, depriving her of her powers. Nebula then escaped.

The Infinity Gauntlet
The newly resurrected Thanos was offended by Nebula's claims of kinship. He reclaimed his ship and almost killed her, using the Infinity Gems. He transformed her into a grotesque virtual corpse still barely alive, leaving her as a maimed and seemingly mindless zombie, burned and disfigured by his energy beams.

When he later claimed the Infinity Gauntlet, Thanos boasted that Nebula was his greatest creation — unable to die, but not truly alive either. However, when Thanos defeated Eternity and took his place, Thanos expanded his consciousness into the universe, leaving his body comatose. Nebula managed to take the Gauntlet from Thanos, using its power to restore herself to health and banish Thanos, seeking to conquer the universe herself. Thanos agreed to help a loose band of Earth heroes defeat Nebula. The group in question consisted of Adam Warlock, Doctor Strange, the Silver Surfer, Thor, the Hulk, Firelord, Doctor Doom and Drax the Destroyer— the only heroes that Strange had been able to locate in the time available to him.

The group confronted her, and, with Thanos exploiting Nebula's inexperience with wielding the Gauntlet, she was tricked into undoing the events of his godhood and all the death and destruction he had wreaked with his power. The Cosmic Pantheon (which Thanos had earlier defeated) immediately appeared, and battled her. With Nebula thus distracted— not realizing that they were keeping her occupied by attacking her all at once, thus preventing her from thinking of a less direct method of assault— the Surfer and Warlock were able to steal the Gauntlet from her by exploiting Warlock's connection to the Soul Gem, disrupting the unity between the Infinity Gems and forcing Nebula to drop the Gauntlet. Nebula was captured by Starfox and returned to Titan for trial, while Adam Warlock claimed the Gauntlet.

Nebula was later confronted by Firelord in the Titanian prison, where the murder of her abusive father was depicted in flashback which left her in a catatonic state. Nebula was later freed from prison by her lieutenant Geatar, and converted into a cyborg by Doctor Mandibus. She attempted to free her pirate crew from the "Anvil" space prison, but was thwarted by the Silver Surfer and Jack of Hearts. She killed her crew in escaping.

When next seen after escaping imprisonment Nebula was gallivanting as a show girl on the party planet of Syllogonia. When she spotted the Silver Surfer and the cosmic hero Genis-Vell there she feared being discovered and scurried away in a panicked flight, something that proved useless as the petulant legacy would continually hound her whilst looking for a good time. After revealing her true identity to the space-faring do-gooder she immediately attacked him with the laser batter in her mechanical arm. A brief fight would break out between the trio where Nebula would pick up a potent energy cannon to waylay the Surfer with. Nebula would attempt to distract the Surfer by attacking a cruise ship to facilitate her escape. But in a bid to twist the knife, she instead disguised herself as his contemporary Genis to catch the surfer off guard. All this did was enrage her pursuer; who had grown so fed up with her antics that Norrin dismantled her firearm before transmuting her armor into a binding shell to incapacitate the brigand with long enough for deliverance to the proper authorities.

At an unknown time and date, Nebula would once again escape confinement to gather an armed force geared towards attacking Thanos's home planet of Titan, Norrin would come to his old Defenders compatriot Doctor Strange seeking aid in stopping the advancement of her recruitment drive. But the would-be pirate empress anticipated the former herald's arrival, and she lay in wait with her first mate Gaetar to ambush him. After having knocked the surfer out with a synaptic disruptor she had her old adversary strapped to an extraterrestrial equivalent of a fusion bomb to be sent straight down into the moon's surface. Her idea of sick revenge against the habitable astral body and the Silver Surfer for past slights. But she underestimated the recruitment that her adversary had brought with him; in her overconfidence, she left War Machine and Thunderstrike to contend with a couple of neurologically modified thugs in her army while she prepped to obliterate former captors. Still believing she had the upper hand after Rhodes had dispatched Gaeter and infiltrated her warship, she deployed the Fusion Reactor the Surfer had been strapped too towards the planetoid; enticing her would-be captor to choose between her incarceration or saving his accomplice and billions of lives down below. Her plan would ultimately fail as Rhodey was able to disable the warhead and free the Surfer, who subsequently zipped back to Nebula's vessel and summarily dealt with her shortly afterward. She is last seen imprisoned back on Titan with her initially assumed deceased first mate just as the Surfer and Legacy brought the loyal fellon in after having bested him and a slew of pirates while in pursuit of earth born criminals the Rhino, Nitro and Titanium Man.

Annihilation
Nebula has appeared as one of Gamora's followers, 'The Graces'. In this role, she battled Ronan the Accuser alongside Stellaris. Ronan triumphed, severely wounding her.

Guardian Team-up
The rogue scion would be contracted by Kindun, a living conduit to the similarly named planet which he inhabited. To bring her adopted sibling Gamora to him seeking to enact retribution for what she and her father/mentor Thanos did in times long past. Nebula herself would enlist an army of Chitauri in pursuit of the Guardians of the Galaxy to accomplish this task, but ran afoul of the heroic Avengers when she and her forces ended up chasing them all the way to Earth.

Thanos Vol. 2
Having been incensed that Taneleer Tivan, the Collector of the Universe had chosen a second ring crew of transporters to ferry sensitive goods over her. Nebula would drop in out of hyperspace to steal their cargo with a new artificially intelligent ship to aid in her larcenous endeavors; while in the middle of the heist she was pinched by her granduncle Eros aided by another Elder Tryco Slatterus, the Champion. To her surprise, she finds that this group meet was set up by Thanos's errant son Thane who had arranged this get-together for the purpose of killing his father. Nebula is initially unimpressed until she hears about his sudden onset of fatal sickness, the piratess remains apprehensive despite Thane's convincing argument, but he goes onto say they need a special kind of contraband to do the deed. Their ultimate goal is to steal precious intel by springing a special prisoner in Terrax the Terrible's personal gulag. A mercenary who once served under the Mad Titan himself who knows a special backdoor entrance into Thano's old fortress, The Black Quadrent.
 
While Starfox worked to distract their unsuspecting host Nebula, Tryco and Thane made their way to the ship's brig to ascertain their prize. Much to Tryco and Nebula's horror, however, there was no prisoner within the ship. What was there was a Phoenix Egg, in her shortsighted anger at such deceptions Nebula shot Thane dead where he stood. Inadvertently unleashing the Phoenix onto its newest host. Realizing how badly they erred in trusting Thane, these odd bedfellows seek out the now crippled and mortal Thanos to enlist his aid in killing his enthralled son.

Although her crew came to the dead, radioactive husk of Titan seeking out their needed ally; Nebula immediately attacked her former grandsire seeking to accomplish what she'd initially joined Thane's merry band to accomplish. Starfox and The Champion of the Universe did their best to try and stymie these patricidal tendencies but were unable to stem the cyborg plunderer's fury. when her granduncle tried using his powers of persuasion on her, Thanos snapped Nebula out of her trance, to which she immediately threatening to feminized him with a razor pointed at his face. She would stymie her own killing rage as Eros explained that their collaboration with the man god whom they initially set out to kill is more out of desperation now that a Phoenix empowered Thane has been loosed upon the cosmos. After hearing of Thanos's plan to find the Witches of Infinity, Nebula is less than pleased with her former lords cobbling aboard her ship without permission. But is silenced into reluctant collusion seeing as she has no real means of killing the all-powerful son of her hated liege. A few amongst their motley crew remain skeptical as to both the whereabouts and existence of this cosmic coven, until they drop out of hyperspace smack in front of a Black Hole which leads directly into their lair.

Whence after Thanos and Eros vacate into the witches' domain, Tryco and Nebula grow rather restless during the wait so they consummate their passions to pass the time. The moments after their fornication are soon beset by the arrival of Thanos's mad son Thane who chases them partway across the universe even after a hyperspace jump, to which they crash land on an uncharted planet in the middle of nowhere. Just as they are about to be eviscerated by Phoenix Thane; they are saved by the untimely arrival of Thanos who, having been reinvigorated by the God Quarry, engages in an epic battle of cosmic proportions with his wayward spawn. Nebula and Champion are caught in the backlash of their cosmic conflagration, seeking space suits on her downed ship to escape the planet their on, Nebula is knocked out by flying debris. She awakens to find herself in the arms of Tryco whom she cuffs for carrying her, only to be caught in the resultant explosion from when Thanos smashed his son into the planet they were fighting on during a desperate escape. As the fighting escalated the two are dragged into the realm of the Stygian Witches by the contrail of the father/son conflict, Nebula is reawakened in the God Quarry by its caretaker after traversing the Black Hole knocked her unconscious again. While waking up Tryco the duo trade questionings about where they are and what all is going on, only to find Eros laying on the floor semi-conscious and half beaten to death. After the battle had been won and Thane was cast into the quarry Thanos turned his attention to his compatriots only to rebuke the lot of them and leave everyone stranded in the witches' domain with no way out. Nebula finds herself exasperated less by the fact that Thanos abandoned her again but more that she is stuck there with her granduncle and her onetime fling.

Asgardians of the Galaxy
Seeing no real way out the undaunted Nebula would partake of the witches' challenge and set foot within the Quarry herself. Coming out of her own desired fulfillment she would emerge from the petrification effect now capable of surviving the airless environment of the elderly watchers abode. Eager to vacate the premise Nebula is dismayed to find that Thanos has been long dead in her absence, by the hand of her hated sibling Gamorra no less. But the Cosmic Coven also inform her that there is another way for her acquire that which she truly desires, assuming she follows in the footsteps of her rival in getting it.

Following the Three-as-One's advice, Nebula sets out to capture a dwarven enclave to coerce one of their master blacksmiths into both making for her a mighty cleaver through which she can shorten distances across the universe and refurbish an artifact of biblical proportions through which she can regain her title as deadliest woman in the galaxy.

To that end, she would have the rest of the Dwarves tortured and ritually sacrificed by removing their fingernails before casting them out in chains to the cold and unforgiving void of space where they all froze to death. While touching down on Draeketh, planet of Temples; she and her surviving dwarven ward accompanied by an army of cutthroats, would go in search of said potent relic of Asgardian make which would enable her to claim Thanos's throne. The Naglefar Beacon, a device with which to call forth the divine cadavers boarding an armada of Norse ferries catered to the apocalyptic horns blow. As the Asgardians of the Galaxy moved in to preempt her latest genocidal schemes, Nebula waylayed Angela long enough to make her escape. Making her way to the planet Netredeen; she would submit the beacon to trial running by summoning the natives' childlike gods to slaughter their worshipers, having decided on such as a tactical measure to occupy her pursuers before heading off to the Shi'ar throneworld. Where she would confront Gladiator and the Imperial Guard as yet another test of the necro god callers world-ending power. Thoroughly satisfied with her latest conquest, Nebula departs the ravaged crown city of Chandilar with a swing of her axe right as the Asgardian spacefarers touched down to apprehend her.

Having secretly made her way to the Sol System, Nebula's first order of business was to incapacitate Thor right before calling the Naglefar Armada down on Earth. As the Asgardians of the Galaxy managed to briefly intercept the fleet of dead deities, Nebula recognizes she'd been trapped in an illusion set by kid Loki as his associates are all seemingly cut down with relative ease. Realizing too little too late she had been distracted long enough for the real thing to board her ship. After a brief skirmish Nebula is finally bested when the beacon is taken off her hands as she lays trapped in an illusion of losing out to Gamora. After her Dwarf thrall fixes her war hatchet she teleports away again, not realizing its warp capabilities had been tampered with.

Working with the Dark Guardians
In the aftermath of the "Infinity Wars" storyline, Nebula was present at Thanos' funeral. Starfox showed all the guests a recording of Thanos stating that he uploaded his consciousness into a new body before his death. The funeral was attacked by the Black Order, who stole Thanos's body and ripped open a hole in space, sending everyone into the rip. Everyone was saved by the arrival of Gladiator and the Shi'ar Empire. Nebula was among those who joined up with Starfox's Dark Guardians. The Dark Guardians found Nova and ambushed him, wounding him enough to crash land onto a planet. When the group argues about Wraith's motives, Nova takes the chance to fly off. The team plans to track her down again.

Powers and abilities
Nebula is an athletic woman, and an excellent armed and unarmed combatant. She possesses a gifted intellect and is a brilliant battle strategist.

Nebula uses blasters worn on her wrists that fire concussive blasts of unknown energy or heat blasts that can incinerate a human being almost instantly. She also apparently wears a device that enables her to disguise her appearance, either through illusion-casting or through actual molecular rearrangement of her body and clothing.

Nebula briefly possessed the Infinity Union, a combination of three devices that together could channel all forms of ambient energy into her, infusing her with vast power. Enabling her to grow in size, be immune to physical harm, invert the Vision's intangibility, teleport, kill and recreate the Stranger, cause the universe to blink in and out of existence, project her consciousness as televised broadcasts or an energy form, and technoform any/all inorganic matter into anything she saw fit. She also briefly possessed the Infinity Gauntlet, which held all six "Infinity Gems" of limitless raw might, apparently giving her absolute control of reality while she possessed them. However, her short-sightedness meant that she often made crucial errors in judgment when wielding the power, like undoing the events of Thanos's godhood without realizing that this would revert her to her near-death state and free the imprisoned Cosmic Pantheon whom Thanos had recently defeated.

Nebula was later converted by Doctor Mandibus into a cyborg. She was given an artificial left eye, left arm, and left shoulder. The left upper quarter of her head and part of her right hip are sheathed in metal. Her bionic limb can stretch to nearly twice its length and has a potent energy cannon in the palm. Nebula's optic receiver had been augmented with the addition of an accelerated probability generator implanted into her systems, giving her detailed understanding and analyzing of effective given variables related to an end goal by calculating the differing course of action one can take to achieve the best possible outcome geared towards reaching it.

Having won out the trial beset by the God Quarry Nebula had not only regained her freedom but came out with the benefit of pseudo divinity as her prize, enabling her to breathe in a cold vacuum without need of a space suit and physically match godlike adversaries.

For a short while Nebula wielded Asgardian weapons of incredible power in her latest scheme for conquest and recognition. Having coerced the Dwarf blacksmith Urzuul into crafting for her a battle ax with trans-spatial warping capabilities rivaling those of the Executioner's own weapon, allowing her to teleport over long distances and back at will.

Another relic she possessed crafted by the trickster god Loki was the Naglefar Beacon, a diabolical horn which controlled the as named by ships teaming with the waiting and resentful cadavers of countless dead divinities stretching along numerous pantheons. Each and everyone of whom representing the leftover remains of gods present after every Ragnarok Cycle where their souls reincarnated into fresh bodies while their old corporeal vessels linger on in perpetual agony. All of whom patiently awaited the horns blow to beset any unsuspecting worlds with their spiteful fury at the reliquaries beck and call.

Reception

Accolades 

 In 2020, Scary Mommy included Nebula in their "Looking For A Role Model? These 195+ Marvel Female Characters Are Truly Heroic" list.
 In 2022, CBR.com ranked Nebula 4th in their "Thanos' Most Powerful Children" list.

In other media

Television
 Nebula appeared in the Silver Surfer episode "Learning Curve", voiced by Jennifer Dale.
 Nebula appears in The Super Hero Squad Show, voiced by Jane Lynch. This version is Thanos' older sister.
 Nebula appears in Guardians of the Galaxy, voiced by Cree Summer. This version is designed to resemble the Marvel Cinematic Universe (MCU) incarnation. Following Ronan the Accuser's death, she competes with Korath the Pursuer and Gamora to fill the resulting power vacuum, during which Nebula obtains Ronan's Universal Weapon. She later uses the living moon Mandala's life-giving powers and a special seed to resurrect Ronan, though the pair are defeated by Mandala with Star-Lord and Groot's help.
 Nebula appears in Lego Marvel Super Heroes - Guardians of the Galaxy: The Thanos Threat, voiced again by Cree Summer.

Marvel Cinematic Universe

Karen Gillan portrays Nebula in media set in the Marvel Cinematic Universe. This version is one of several adopted children raised by Thanos alongside her adopted sister Gamora, with whom she developed a rivalry. Over time, Nebula developed an obsessive need to best Gamora in combat, but every time she lost, Thanos subjected her to torturous mutilation, replacing parts of her body with cybernetic enhancements. This imbued Nebula with a deep hatred toward Thanos as well as resentment towards Gamora for not treating her like a sister. Throughout the live-action films Guardians of the Galaxy, Guardians of the Galaxy Vol. 2, Avengers: Infinity War, and Avengers: Endgame, Nebula eventually reconciles with Gamora, becomes a member of the Guardians of the Galaxy, and works with the Avengers to stop Thanos.

Additionally, Gillan voices alternate timeline versions of Nebula in the Disney+ animated series What If...? and reprises her role in The Guardians of the Galaxy Holiday Special.

Video games
 Nebula appears as a boss in Marvel Super Heroes: War of the Gems.
 Nebula appears in Marvel Super Hero Squad: The Infinity Gauntlet, voiced again by Jane Lynch.
 Nebula appears in Marvel: Avengers Alliance.
 Nebula appears as a playable character in Marvel: Future Fight.
 Nebula appears in Marvel Avengers Academy, voiced by Linnea Sage.
 Nebula appears as an unlockable playable character in Lego Marvel's Avengers.
 Nebula appears in Guardians of the Galaxy: The Telltale Series, voiced by Ashly Burch. Following Thanos' death in episode one, Gamora tells Star-Lord that part of her wants to see Nebula again. Depending on the player's choices, he will either tell her that Nebula is family or that calling her could be a mistake. If the former choice is made, Nebula expresses anger over how the Guardians killed Thanos during Gamora's call. In episode two, Nebula attacks the location where Thanos' body is being held, though Star-Lord and Gamora subdue her and lock her in Gamora's room on their starship, the Milano. Star-Lord and Gamora later come to her for help in translating ancient Kree glyphs he saw in a vision, but Nebula proves reluctant. After Drax discovers a device in Nebula's head, Star-Lord persuades her to give it to him. When Kree soldiers working for Hala the Accuser attack the ship, Star-Lord will have the option to release Nebula to help fight them. In episode three, Star-Lord experiences Gamora's flashbacks of Nebula while she was being trained by Thanos before deciding whether Nebula stays or goes. Depending on the choice, Nebula will either reconcile with Gamora or join Hala's forces respectively.
 Nebula appears as a playable character in Marvel: Contest of Champions.
 Nebula appears as a playable character in Lego Marvel Superheroes 2, voiced by Arina Li.
 Nebula appears as a boss in Marvel Ultimate Alliance 3: The Black Order, voiced again by Ashly Burch.
 Nebula appears as a boss in Marvel Future Revolution.
 Nebula appears appears in Marvel Snap.

References

External links
 
 
 Nebula at Comic Vine

Characters created by John Buscema
Characters created by Roger Stern
Comics characters introduced in 1985
Cyborg superheroes
Cyborg supervillains
Female characters in film
Fictional characters with superhuman durability or invulnerability
Fictional extraterrestrial cyborgs
Fictional mass murderers
Fictional mercenaries in comics
Fictional women soldiers and warriors
Guardians of the Galaxy characters
Marvel Comics aliens
Marvel Comics characters with superhuman strength
Marvel Comics cyborgs
Marvel Comics extraterrestrial superheroes
Marvel Comics extraterrestrial supervillains
Marvel Comics female superheroes
Marvel Comics female supervillains
Marvel Comics film characters
Marvel Comics martial artists
Space pirates